Kevin Clarke's A Young Man's World is a 2000 American gay pornographic film written and directed by Kevin Clarke and starring Joe Landon and Ashton Ryan. It was produced and cinematographed by Barry Knight and Russell Moore of Delta Productions and distributed by Paladin Video. The film's duration is two hours; its date of production is July 22, 2000, and it was shot on high-definition video.

Synopsis 
Five middle-aged menRon Aron, Kevin Clarke, Barry Knight, Russell Moore, and Derrick Stanton; all of whom have non-sexual rolescelebrate Barry Knight's 50th birthday in a spectacular home. They reflect on what they did when they were about 18 and fantasize scenes of young men together.

Scenes
 One: Court Logan and Trent Sebastian; Ron Aron, fantasizing
 Two: Adam Bristol and Justin Roxx; non-sexual roles, fantasizing
 Three: Jonathan Prescott, Antonio Madiera, and Zach Rhodes; Russell Moore, fantasizing
 Four: Aston Ryan and Jace Hughes; Kevin Clarke and Barry Knight, fantasizing
 Five: Joe Landon, Dave Parker, and Adam Bristol; Kevin Clarke, fantasizing

Cast 
In order of cast appearance:

 Ashton Ryan
 Court Logan
 Zach Rhodes
 Dave Parker
 Jace Hughes
 Justin Roxx
 Antonio Madiera
 Jonathan Prescott
 Trent Sebastian
 Adam Bristol

Non-sexual
 Ron Aron
 Kevin Clarke
 Barry Knight
 Russell Moore
 Derrick Stanton

Production 
Kevin Clarke wrote and directed the film. Barry Knight and Russell Moore of Delta Productions produced and cinematographed the film in high-definition video.

Reception 
Giacomo Tramontagna from The Guide magazine awarded the film two stars, and said it was "the juxtaposition of five middle-aged guests with five young guys in swimsuits" and a "problematic tribute to the joys of youth". Tramontgana found the fictional middle-aged male characters demeaning to real-life middle-aged men, and considered this film suitable for either "narcissistic airhead brats who hate older men or youth-obsessed older men who hate themselves". He found the setup of the sex scenes "inconsistent and sometimes disorienting", but he picked scenes between Ashton Ryan and Jace Hughes as "the best of five erotic sequences", which he said were "sincere, spontaneous, lively, [and] passionate".

A reviewer from the Ambush Mag website praised the actors' performances, the music score and sex scenes, and wrote, "you're just gonna love the entire movie". Bo Champion from ManNet.com praised the sex scenes as mandatory to the video and wrote, "while the plot is interesting, the execution is at times too cute and sometimes confusing and, in the end, a bit disconcerting to some of us who are graciously considered Baby Boomers". A reviewer from FriskyFans.org awarded the film four out of five stars and wrote, "A Young Man's World fulfills anyone's desire to see the finest of the finest young men".

Awards and nominations 
Adam Bristol, Joe Landon, and Dave Parker
 (Winner) 2001 GayVN Awards — Best Threesome
 (Winner) 2001 Gay Erotic Video Awards — Best Three-way
 (Nominated) 2001 Grabby Awards — Best Threeway Sex Scene

References

Further reading 

 
  Retrieved at the Internet Archive Wayback Machine.

External links 
 
Cast
 
 
 Dave Parker at the Gay Erotic Video Index

2000 films
2000 LGBT-related films
2000s pornographic films
American pornographic films
Gay pornographic films
2000s English-language films
2000s American films